Juan Antonio Delgado Navarro, better known as Juanan Delgado (born 26 October 1964 in Bilbao, Spain) is a Spanish rally co-driver, in 2011 winner of the FIA Alternative Energies World Cup for co-drivers. He participated in the championship together with Basque driver Jesús Echave (Vitoria, 1954), who concluded fourth in the driver standings.

References

Spanish rally co-drivers
Sportspeople from Bilbao
1964 births
FIA E-Rally Regularity Cup drivers
Living people